After the fall of Communism in Romania, between 1995 and 2004, a number of war criminals were rehabilitated by the Romanian Supreme Court. The rehabilitation process was part of the general efforts made by Romania to distance itself from its Communist past, as those convicted were sentenced after the country fell under Soviet influence in the wake of World War II. However, as a former Axis country during the Second World War, these rehabilitation initiatives put Romania at odds with the West (the United States in particular), as the former was seeking to join NATO and EU. Thus, the number of acquittals was relatively small, and rehabilitation initiatives ceased altogether in 2004, after Romania joined NATO.

Chronology

In 1995, the Romanian Supreme Court rehabilitated 10 out of the 14 writers convicted during the "Journalists' Trial" of 1945. The fourteen were convicted of war crimes because they disseminated antisemitic and Fascist propaganda, supporting Nazism and Fascism. The Court reasoned that - while their writings did express harmful ideas and would be considered wrong by modern-day standards - such propaganda was common before and during the war, expressing ideas that were dominant in the era. Their writings were thus protected as free speech. Among the eleven who were acquitted, the most prominent was Nichifor Crainic (Stelian Popescu was also notable among them), and among the three who were not acquitted, the most prominent was Radu Gyr. Nichifor Crainic served as Minister of Propaganda in the Government of Marshal Ion Antonescu.

Two Romanian Army colonels, Radu Dinulescu and Gheorghe Petrescu, were acquitted by the Romanian Supreme Court in 1998 and 1999, respectively. The two were convicted in 1953 of war crimes and crimes against humanity because they participated in the preparations for the Iași pogrom, they organized the deportations to Transnistria, and they mistreated prisoners of war and civilians. Dinulescu has been referred to as "the Eichmann of Romania". The two colonels were acquitted through a procedure called "extraordinary appeal", which was irreversible.

Between 1998 and 2000, three convicted wartime Government officials were rehabilitated. Following the Nuremberg Trials model, these were sentenced for "crimes against peace". On 26 October 1998, the Court rehabilitated Toma Ghițulescu. His acquittal was made possible by the briefness of his term as Undersecretary of State in the National Economy Minister (5 April to 26 May 1941) as well as the fact that he resigned before 30 June 1941, the date of the Iași pogrom. The case of Ghițulescu is however not unique, as the Romanian Supreme Court also rehabilitated Gheron Netta on 17 January 2000. Netta served as Finance Minister between 1 April and 23 August 1944, in the Third Antonescu cabinet. In 1999, Prime Minister Ion Gigurtu, who preceded Ion Antonescu in 1940 and enacted a Romanian version of the Nuremberg laws, was also rehabilitated. It is also worth noting that Toma Ghițulescu was the only one out of the eight members of the Antonescu Government proposed for rehabilitation in 1998 who was acquitted. Pressures made by two US officials, Senator Alfonse D'Amato and Representative Christopher Smith, precluded the acquittal of the remaining seven. Romania was threatened with the reassessment of Western support for its integration within EU and NATO should the eight be acquitted. It was only Toma Ghițulescu, whose brief tenure in the Antonescu Government and the date of his resignation, allowed for his rehabilitation to be carried out.

The last rehabilitation took place in 2004. Ion Pănescu, commander of the Chernivtsi Airport during World War II, was convicted in 1950 for using the regime of Jewish slave labor to his own advantage. He was acquitted in 2004. That same year, the "extraordinary appeal" procedure - which was used to irreversibly acquit the previously-mentioned war criminals - was eliminated from the Romanian legislation following recommendations from the European Court of Human Rights.

References 

Romanian people of World War II
People acquitted of international crimes